Daniel Eisenstein (born 1970) is an American cosmologist and academic. Eisenstein's Ph.D. (1996) is from Harvard University. He held postdoctoral positions at the Institute for Advanced Study and the University of Chicago before moving to the University of Arizona as a professor in 2001. He moved to his current position as a professor of astronomy at Harvard University in 2010. He was joint-winner of the 2014 Shaw Prize. An Asteroid (183287 Deisenstein) was named in his honor.  He graduated from Harvard University.

References

Living people
1970 births
American cosmologists
Harvard University faculty
Place of birth missing (living people)
Simons Investigator
Harvard University alumni